Choji Station is a commuter railway station on Seoul Subway Line 4 and Seohae Line in Ansan, South Korea. Trains on Line 4 utilize what is officially named the Ansan Line within the city of Ansan, as do those on the Suin-Bundang Line, which stop at the station on the same tracks using the same platforms.

The station opened as Gongdan Station. In 2012, the city government of Ansan announced that this station would be officially renamed to Choji Station at the end of June that year.

Station layout

References 

Metro stations in Ansan
Seoul Metropolitan Subway stations
Railway stations opened in 1994